This is a list of all the United States Supreme Court cases from volume 439 of the United States Reports:

External links

1978 in United States case law